{{Speciesbox
| parent = Mecodema
| taxon = Mecodema crenicolle
| image = Mecodema crenicolle 2.jpg
| image_alt = Mecodema crenicolle
| authority = Laporte de Castelnau, 1867
| synonyms = Mecodema venator  Broun 1880Mecodema variolosum Broun 1903Mecodema attenuatum Broun 1908Mecodema ventriculum Broun 1923 
}}Mecodema crenicolle is an endemic species of ground beetle from New Zealand.

Taxonomy
This species was described by François-Louis Laporte de Castelnau, a french naturalist in 1867. The type specimen is in the Genoa Museum, Italy.

DescriptionMecodema crenicolle is a medium-large ground beetle with a length of 22–29 mm. As a member of the ducale group of Mecodema species, the pronotum carina is strongly crenulated and outer striae are coarsely punctured with star-shaped asetose punctures. These punctures are irregularly placed and deeper in the outer striae. A distinguishing character of M. crenicolle from its sister species, M. crenaticolle is that the punctures in elytral stria 7 are larger than stria 8 and cannot be distinguished at the base of the elytra.

Habitat and ecologyM. crenicolle is a burrowing ground beetle that lives in  native forests, pine plantations and pastures. Their elevational distribution ranges from lowland to mountainous forests. Like all Mecodema species, M. crenicolle is flightless and a predator of other invertebrates.

Distribution
This species may have both a North Island and South Island distribution. North Island specimens exist, including the type specimen from Auckland and specimens from the Bay of Plenty due to the synonomy of M. variolosum'' by Britton. However, these could be errors, as it has rarely been collected on the North Island and may therefore may only be found in Marlborough, Nelson and the Brunner District in the South Island.

References

Beetles of New Zealand
Taxa named by François-Louis Laporte, comte de Castelnau
Beetles described in 1867
crenicolle